The Danish Meteorological Institute (DMI) is the official Danish meteorological institute, administrated by the Ministry of Energy, Utilities and Climate. It makes weather forecasts and observations for Denmark, Greenland, and the Faroe Islands.

History
It was founded in 1873, largely through the efforts of Ludwig A. Colding.

The Danish Meteorological Institute – DMI – encompasses the combined knowledge of the former Meteorological Institute, the Meteorological Service for Civil Aviation and the Meteorological Service for Defence. The Meteorological Institute was founded in 1872 under the Ministry of the Navy. The Meteorological Service for Civil Aviation was established in 1926, and used to be part of the Civil Aviation Administration. The Meteorological Service for Defence was established in 1953. The present-day DMI was established in 1990 through the merger of the three above-mentioned institutions. DMI is organized under the Ministry of Transport, and has a staff of about 380. In addition, DMI has around 450 voluntary weather and climate observers.

The institute was founded for the purpose of “making observations, communicating them to the general public, and developing scientific meteorology”. These remain DMI's most important tasks, even though society and means of communication have developed enormously in the intervening period, as too has the need for qualified meteorological advice. DMI presently possesses comprehensive, internationally acclaimed knowledge about every aspect of weather and climate.

DMI is responsible for serving the meteorological needs of society within the kingdom of Denmark (Denmark, the Faroes and Greenland) including territorial waters and airspace. This entails monitoring weather, climate and environmental conditions in the atmosphere, on the land and at sea. The primary aim of these activities is to safeguard human life and property, as well as to provide a foundation for economic and environmental planning – especially within the armed forces, aviation, shipping and road traffic.

DMI's most familiar services are the media weather forecast, but the institute also assists the business community, institutions and members of the public in making sound decisions from the economic, environment and safety points of view. A wide range of services is also utilized by the fishery and agricultural sectors, by sports associations and others.

DMI's expertise and service is to some extent founded on advanced new technology within super computers, satellites, radar and automatic measuring equipment. Solid research and development work ensures that DMI is run economically and rationally, and that the quality of the products meets modern expectations.

In 1985, DMI together with other national weather services in Nordic countries and the Netherland, Ireland and Spain to form a research collaboration around HIgh Resolution Limited Area Model (HIRLAM) for weather forecasting. The cross-country research collaboration on limited area numerical weather prediction (NWP) is the first of its kind in the world, which resulted in successful operational implementation of state of art short range regional weather forecast model in Denmark and other member services of HIRLAM. Since 2004, HIRLAM entered a research collaboration with the ALADIN consortia led by Météo-France in joint research and development for the mesoscale, nonhydrostatic forecast system AROME. Through this code collaboration, HIRLAM consortia developed the new generation cloud-resolving NWP system Harmonie-arome, which focus on operational application of kilometer scale, ensemble forecast with focus to predict and warn high impact weather such as flash flooding, thunderstorms, heavy rain in summer and gusty wind, snow storms etc. in winter. At DMI,  Harmonie-based kilometer-scale forecast system has been gradually operationalised since 2013 for use in routine forecast for Greenland, Faroe Islands and Denmark. In 2017, DMI introduced an innovative 25-member 2.5 km resolution ensemble forecast system COMEPS (COntinuous Mesoscale Ensemble Prediction System), which is based on hourly data assimilation on overlapped observation window, and an hourly refresh of probabilistic forecast with lagging. In 2018, DMI operationalised the first hectometric scale NWP system for prediction of strong coastal wind in south Greenland.

DMI runs an ice patrol service based in Narsarsuaq (southern Greenland) that observes the sea ice and icebergs along the coasts of Greenland, draws up ice charts and solves other safety-related tasks for navigation in Greenland marine waters.

Equipment
In 1984, DMI acquired a Sperry 1100 from University of Copenhagen, and upgraded it with vector processors in 1985. It was replaced with a Convex 3880 in 1992. A NEC SX 4 was used from 1996, and a NEC SX-6 from 2002. A dual Cray XT5 marked the switch from vector to scalar in 2007. From 2016, the Icelandic Meteorological Office (Veðurstofa) manages a 192 teraFLOPS dual Cray XC30 system for DMI as weather forecast, due to cheaper electricity and cooling. One is used for development, the other for daily operations. Data traffic between Iceland and Denmark uses two 10 Gbit/s cables (Danice/FARICE-1). The XC30s are scheduled to be upgraded to 700 Tflops in 2018.

See also
North West Shelf Operational Oceanographic System
NinJo workstation used by DMI

References

External links
 Official website

Scientific organizations based in Denmark
Meteorological Institute
Governmental meteorological agencies in Europe
Government agencies established in 1872
1872 establishments in Denmark